Martin Sinner (born 7 February 1968) is a professional tennis player from Germany.  He achieved a career-high singles ranking of world No. 42 in 1995.

Sinner played professional tennis for 15 years and earned $896,974. Currently he is a coach in tennis club SV Böblingen (Germany).

ATP career finals

Singles: 2 (2 titles)

Doubles: 1 (runner-up)

ATP Challenger and ITF Futures finals

Singles: 10 (5–5)

Doubles: 13 (8–5)

Performance timelines

Singles

External links
 
 

1968 births
Living people
German male tennis players
Hopman Cup competitors
Sportspeople from Koblenz
West German male tennis players
German tennis coaches